Edmund Becke (fl. 1550), Anglican theological writer, was ordained deacon by Bishop Nicholas Ridley in 1551.

Works
In 1549 he supervised an edition of the Bible, "truly and purely translated into English and nowe lately with greate industry and diligence recognized". The volume was printed by John Day and William Seres, and was preceded by a long dedicatory address to "the most puisant and mighty prince  Edwarde the Sixt", signed by his "most humble and obedient subiect Edmund Becke". An autograph copy of the address is among the Ashmolean manuscripts at Oxford. Becke there speaks of the book as "the frutes of myne industry", but it appears to be a re-print of T. Matthew's (i.e. John Rogers') "Bible" published in 1537, though it contains Tyndale's 1534 version of 2 Thessalonians chapter 2, not the 1535 revision that was carried into the Matthew bible. There are also significant variations in the tone and theology of the notes. It contains Tindal's preface to the New Testament.
 
Becke's chief original contribution consists of "a perfect supputation of the yeares and tyme from Adam unto Christ, proued by the Scriptures after the colleccyon of dyuers Authours". In 1551 Becke published two more Bibles, one printed by John Day, 'faythfully set forth according to ye coppy of Thomas Matthewes translacion [really Taverner's Bible of 1539] wherevnto are added certaine learned prologues and annotacions for the better understanding of many hard places threwout the whole Byble'. The dedicatory address and the various prologues which occur in Becke's earlier edition of the Bible are again inserted, and include the infamous "wife-beater's note" on 1 Peter 3, which advises men to beat their wives if they will not "do their duty." The other Bible followed the Matthew revision, and was printed by N. Hyll.

Becke's other works included: 1. Two Dyalogues wrytten in Latin by the famous clerke D. Erasmus of Roterodame, one called Polyphemus or the Gospeller, the other dysposing of thynges and names; translated into Englyshe by Edmond Becke. And prynted at Canterbury in Saynt Paules paryshe by John Mychell. 2. A Brefe Confutacion of this most detestable and Anabaptistrial opinion that Christ dyd not take hys flesh of the blessed Vyrgyn Mary nor any corporal substance of her body. For the maintenaunce whereof Jhone Bucher, otherwise called Jhon of Kent, most obstinately suffered and was burned in Smythfyelde, the ii. day of May Anno Domini M.D.L. (London, John Day, 1550, quarto.) The first tract is described by Becke as "the fyrste frutes of this my symple translacyon", and as undertaken at the request of "a nere cosyn of myne" for "such as are not lerned in the Latin tongue". It is undated; its publication at Canterbury suggests some ecclesiastical connection between Becke and that town. The second tract is a popular rhyming pamphlet, written to point the moral of the martyrdom of the anabaptist Joan Bocher, which is fully described by Stow. The tract has been reprinted by Mr. J. P. Collier in the second volume of his Illustrations of Early English Popular Literature (1864).

References

DNB references
These references are found in the DNB article referred to above.

External links
 

Year of birth missing
Year of death missing
16th-century English people
Bible translators